Neocollyris rogeri is a species of ground beetle in the genus Neocollyris in the subfamily Carabinae. It was described by Shook and Wu in 2006, and is endemic to the Yunnan province of China.

References

Rogeri, Neocollyris
Beetles described in 2006
Endemic fauna of Yunnan